Gallet (ˈgæl.eɪ) is a historic Swiss manufacturer of high-end timepieces for professional, military, sports, racing, and aviation use. Gallet  is the world's oldest watch and clock making house with history dating back to Humbertus Gallet, a clock maker who became a citizen of Geneva in 1466. The Gallet & Cie (Gallet & Company) name was officially registered by Julien Gallet (1806–1849) in 1826, who moved the family business from Geneva to La Chaux-de-Fonds, Switzerland. Prior to this date, operations commenced under the name of each of the Gallet family patriarchs.

Gallet is best known during the 20th century to the present day for its line of MultiChron chronograph wristwatches. Produced primarily for military, industrial, auto racing, and other professional applications, Gallet's MultiChron watches often incorporated a number of advanced timekeeping innovations.

A Gallet timepiece of particular renown was the Flight Officer time zone chronograph. Commissioned by Senator Harry S. Truman in 1939 for pilots of the United States Army Air Forces, the Flight Officer (a.k.a. Flying Officer) had a rotating 12-hour bezel and the names of 23 major world cities printed on the periphery of the dial (face).  These features made it possible to calculate changes in the time as an aviator flew across lines of longitude. Besides being the first time zone calculating wristwatch based upon a 12-hour system (24 hour world time wristwatches were produced by Patek Philippe in 1937), the Flight Officer was the first wristwatch with a rotating bezel and one of the world's first wrist chronographs to be housed in a water-resistant case. Truman wore a Gallet Flight Officer during his terms as 33rd president (1945–1953).

The modern Gallet Company is one of a small handful of independent Swiss watch brands that still maintain in-house manufacturing facilities. While recently expanding the company's marketing focus to reach a wider audience of “civilian” consumers for its upscale professional-use timepieces, Gallet continues to privately produce components and modules for a number of other entities within the luxury-class timekeeping industry.

History

For the Gallet family of watchmakers, the relocation to La Chaux-de-Fonds in 1826 after 350 years in Geneva proved to be a most advantageous move. With the resources available in the “Watch Valley”, family patriarch Julien Gallet (1806–1849) was able to expand the new company's distribution of its pocket watches to all of Europe.

In 1855, Julien Gallet's son Léon (1832–1899) purchased Grumbach & Co., complete with factory and equipment, to address the need for greater manufacturing capabilities. With this increase in work area, Gallet was able to bring together under one roof many of the Jura Region's watchmakers to help meet Europe's increasing demand for watches.

Léon Gallet allowed his watchmakers to benefit through the registration of patents in their own names. This unique approach inspired innovation with Gallet's artisans and allowed the company to offer a very extensive range of watches. With innovation came growth and Gallet & Cie grew to become one of the largest timekeeping manufacturers in Switzerland.

Léon Gallet set his sights on the rest of the world markets. In 1864, Léon's brother, Lucien Gallet (1834–1879), established the company's first US location in Chicago, with a New York City office following soon after. Together with Jules Racine, a cousin of the Gallet brothers living in the US, the company began its expansion into the American market.

Due to the American consumer's preference for domestically styled products, the Gallet Company created numerous new lines to accommodate this. Not including watches privately labeled for established jewelry retailers, Gallet introduced thirty-seven new brands. While the names that appeared on the dials and the overall appearance and function of these watches were tailored to American tastes, all cases and movements continued to be produced in Gallet's La Chaux-Fonds workshop.

Each of the numerous brands were designed to target a different demographic. Lower priced watches were supplied to the average working man, as well as expensive high-grade and complicated timepieces in solid gold cases for the wealthy. Gallet's finest pocket watches, hand-built in the classic Swiss tradition and retaining the family flagship and Electa names, were always available. Although not initially successful, included with the company's American offerings in 1895 were the world's first wrist-worn watches produced for mass consumption. By the end of the 19th century, the Gallet family was manufacturing and selling over 100,000 timepieces per year.

When the worldwide economic downturn of the 1930s caused international trade to plunge by as much as two-thirds, it suddenly became unprofitable for the Gallet Company to continue production of many of its recently established brands. Gallet chose instead to consolidate its efforts back into its primary area of expertise, that of the manufacture of high quality professional-use timepieces. Under the family name, the Gallet Company continued to flourish by providing hand-held timers and chronograph wristwatches to allied military and industrial clients during the years leading up to and through World War II. During this period, the Gallet's sales again surpassed 100,000 units annually.

A wartime Gallet timepiece of particular renown was the Flight Officer time-zone chronograph (1939–present). Commissioned by Senator Harry S. Truman's senatorial staff in 1939 for the United States Army Air Force, this wristwatch made it possible to calculate changes in the time as a pilot flew across lines of longitude.

After the war, Gallet's renewed worldwide popularity with civilians and professionals in the fields of aviation, sports, medicine, and technology eliminated the necessity to manufacture numerous secondary brands. With the exception of the few brand names that the company retained for its sports and industrial stopwatch lines, most of Gallet's previously held trademarks went back into circulation.

Timeline

 1466: Humbertus Gallet, living and working in Geneva, becomes a citizen of the republic on 18 April. Historical references point to his profession as a horloger or clock maker.
 1685: Due to the abolition by French King Louis XIV of the tolerance agreement of Nantes, additional members of the Bourg-en-Bresse Gallet family, whose professions are documented as goldsmiths and watchmakers, join their relatives in Geneva to live and practice their trade.
 1702: Philippe Gallet (1679–1739), son of Jacques Gallet (1649–1700) and Marie Bouvier Gallet, is included in the Geneva Registry of Jewelers and Watchmakers.

 1742: Pierre Gallet (1712–1768) marries noblewoman Jeanne Renée de Rabours. The marriage contract records Pierre Gallet's profession as master goldsmith. This document also lists the occupation of Pierre's father, Philippe Gallet (1679–1739), as goldsmith and watchmaker.
 1744: Jeanne Renee gives birth to a son, Jacques, who follows in his father's occupation as jeweler and watchmaker.
 1774: Jacques Gallet (1745–1806) fathers a son, Jean-Louis Gallet (1774–1809).
 1798: Jean-Louis Gallet becomes a French citizen after Napoleon annexes Geneva.
 1804: Napoleon annexes Geneva, naming it the Lemanique Republic. Jean Louis Gallet becomes a French citizen and continues his father's jewelry and watch making company until his premature death in 1809 at age 35.
 1826: Julien Gallet (1806–1849), son of Jean Louis, relocates the family watch making business to La Chaux-de-Fonds, a major center for pocket watch production. At this time, the company is officially registered as Gallet & Cie (Gallet & Company), a break from the tradition of naming the business after the family patriarch.
 1848: Julien Gallet dies at 43, after which, the company is run by his widow Louise, and sons Leon and Lucien.
 1855: Léon Gallet (1832–1899) becomes the patriarchal figure of the rapidly growing Gallet & Cie.
 1864: Léon Gallet's brother Lucien Gallet establishes the company's first US location in Chicago, with a New York City office following soon after. Together with Jules Racine, a cousin of the Gallet brothers living in the US, the company expands its distribution to the American market.
 1876: In response to the growing threat of competition for sales of timepieces by industrially advanced American manufacturer's, Léon Gallet, together with Louis and Jules Courvoisier, Ernest Francillon of Longines, and Constant Girard-Gallet of Girard-Perregaux, found the Societe Intercantonale des Industries du Jura (Intercantonal Society for Industries of the Jura Region) on 30 April. Benefiting from the unified strength of combined Swiss manufacturing resources, the group is able to maintain its sales dominance in Europe. Marketing for the syndicate is primarily European based with an emphasis on sales to England.
 1880: Henriette Gallet (1860–1939), daughter of Léon Gallet, is wed to Émile Courvoisier (1858–1937), son of Louis Courvoisier (1825–1885), at which time the working relationship between these two important La Chaux-de-Fonds watch manufacturers becomes familial.
 1881: Léon L. Gallet commissions and trademarks the Gallet Lyre Mark. The Lyre Mark is stamped on watch cases and movements manufactured in the La Chaux-de-Fonds workshop.
 1882: A strategic partnership is formed with Jules Jeanneret & Fils, to supply mechanisms for Gallet's professional use line of hand-held timers and pocket chronographs.
 1883: Léon hands over management of the Gallet company to his older son Julien (1862–1934), but continues to remain involved until his 1899 death in New York. The JG initials are added to the Gallet Lyre Mark and the company name is temporarily changed to Julien Gallet & Cie to reflect the older son's control of the business. Georges Gallet (1865–1946), Léon's younger son, assists his brother with the management of the company while working part-time at Courvoisier & Frères. By this time, the Gallet Company is producing more than 100,000 watches annually.
 1891: Gallet begins production of watches for Louis Goering of La Chaux-de-Fonds under the names Harvard, Imperial, and The Sun. Two Gallet manufactured "The Sun" stopwatches are used to time the world's first successful airplane flight by the Wright brothers in 1903.
 1892: Gallet introduces the first wrist-worn watches for mass consumption by men and women to the American market. These first "wristwatches" are immediately rejected due to public perception as being too unusual for women and too feminine for men. All unsold examples are soon returned to Switzerland for disassembly. In spite of initial resistance to this groundbreaking innovation, wristwatches are issued during World War I as a more useful way for soldiers to tell time in combat situations. As a result, this new concept gains acceptance, and is soon added to the offerings of numerous other watch companies.
 1893: Berthe Courvoisier (1868–1936), daughter of Louis Philippe Courvoisier and an heir to the family watch company, is wed to Georges Gallet, son of Léon. Berthe Courvoisier and her brother Émile, together with Georges Gallet and his sister Henriette, continue to manage the Courvoisier Frères watch company. Georges Gallet assumes the role as co-director of the company while managing the Fabrique Electa division of Gallet & Cie.
 1896: Rail road pocket watches with chronometer grade movements with patented regulators are created by Gallet under the Interocean brand name and distributed by Timothy Eaton (T. Eaton Department Store) for railway use.
 1896: Gallet wins a silver medal at the Swiss National Exhibition in Geneva.
 1899: Upon his death, Léon Gallet bequeaths a sum of 43,000 Swiss Francs (today equivalent to approx. 1,000,000 US dollars) to the town of La Chaux-de-Fonds, of which 25,000 Swiss Francs is used for the construction of the Musée international d'horlogerie (International Museum of Watch Making). To assist the museum in building its initial collection of timepieces, Georges Gallet donates over 100 highly complex and valuable Gallet, Electa, and Courvoisier watches. Georges Gallet serves as director of the museum for the next twenty years.
 1900: Shortly after Léon Gallet's death, the company name is changed back to Gallet & Cie (Gallet & Co.).
 1905: Gallet wins a Diploma of Honor at the Liège International.
 1906: The company name "Gallet & Cie, Fabrique d’horlogerie Electa" is registered to reinforce Gallet's ownership and control of the Electa brand. Under the Electa name, Gallet produces its highest quality timepieces.
 1911: Henri Jeanneret-Brehm, a member of the esteemed Jeanneret family of St. Imier watchmakers, purchases the Magnenat-Lecoultre factory with financial assistance from the Gallet company.
 1912: Gallet creates the first wristwatch for mass distribution to include a full-sized constant seconds hand originating from the center of the dial (face). This innovation proved useful for timing tasks that emphasized seconds over minutes and hours, including the measuring of the human heart rate. Gallet's new “sweep second” wristwatches were issued to military nurses and medics during World War I.
 1914: Gallet wins the Grand Prize in the Chronometer category at the Swiss National Exhibition in Berne. Production begins in Gallet's Electa workshops on an extra high quality series of watches for wealthy patrons of the Laforge & Valentine jewelry department of Macy's New York store. Manufactured under the “Lifetime Series” trademark, all watches contain between 21 and 23 ruby jeweled bearings, bimetallic temperature compensation balances, over coil hairsprings, and function at six position chronometer level accuracy.
 1915: Gallet supplies hand held and cockpit mounted timers to the British Air Force during World War I. Movements are produced in Gallet's Electa workshop and marked with the Electa name.
 1916: Gallet supplies wrist-worn timers to the British armed forces during World War I. This early chronograph wristwatch was an obvious transitional timepiece. While technically refined and reduced in size from a traditional hand-held timer, it still retains the three-piece case, porcelain enamel dial, and center button crown of its larger predecessor.
 1917: Gallet wins the 1st place award for chronometer accuracy at the Canton Observatory in Neuchâtel.
 1918: Jeanneret-Brehm begins manufacturing under the company name Excelsior Park. Deriving the name from Jenneret-Brehm's previously registered “Excelsior” trademark, the English variation of the French word for “park” is utilized at the prompting of Gallet to support the collaborative efforts of the two companies in their marketing focus on the American consumer. The cooperative relationship of Excelsior Park and Gallet leads to the development of a number of time recording mechanisms, including the calibre 40. These new chronograph movements are utilized almost exclusively in Gallet and Excelsior Park wristwatches, with a small number supplied to the Girard Perregaux and Zenith companies when production capabilities allowed.
 1927: Gallet introduces the “Regulator” and “Duo Dial” wristwatches for the medical and technical professions. The large-sized lower subsidiary seconds dial of the rectangular Duo-Dial and the predominant resetting sweep-second hand of the Regulator simplify the task of calculating a person's per-minute heart rate.
 1929: While Gallet develops viable markets for its new wristwatch innovations, the company is able to survive the Great Depression by supplying professional use “tool watches” to its military and industrial clients.
 1935: As World War II becomes imminent, Gallet begins production of wristwatches, boat clocks with 8-day movements, and military stopwatches for Great Britain, Canada, and the U.S.A. At the start of World War II, production again surpasses 100,000 watches annually.
 1936: Gallet introduces the first water resistant cases for protecting the delicate mechanism of chronograph wristwatches from the damaging effects of humidity. This innovation become standard on many models in Gallet's "MultiChron" line of professional use timepieces, as well as the upcoming Flight Officer military issue pilot's watch.
 1938: Commissioned by Senator Harry S Truman staff for the pilots of the U.S. Army Air Forces, Gallet creates the Flight Officer chronograph. This wristwatch provides a combination of innovations. Besides the ability to accurately record events ranging from 1/5 second to 30 minutes in duration, the rotating 12-hour bezel and dial (face) printed with the major cities gives pilots the ability to calculate changes in the time as lines of longitude are crossed. Truman wears a Gallet Flying Officer during his two terms as US president.
 1939: Gallet produces the Multichron Petite. The Petite is one of the first wrist chronographs engineered exclusively for enlisted women assigned to technical and scientific tasks during World War II. Powered by the 10 ligne Valjoux 69 movement, and measuring only 26.6mm in diameter, the MultiChron Petite becomes the smallest mechanical chronograph manufactured to date.
 1945: Gallet introduces the MultiChron Yachting chronograph. The Yachting is the world's first wrist chronograph with15-10-5 regatta count down timer for racing. Besides it use on the water, the MultiChron Yachting functions as an all-purpose 45 minute chronograph.
 1946: With the end of World War II, and the death of his father Georges, Léon Gallet assumes management of the Gallet Company. Only minor changes are needed to transform the appearance of Gallet's military style watches into trendy chronographs for sportsmen and civilian pilots.
 1965: Gallet introduces the Excel-O-Graph. This pilot's wristwatch features a rotating bezel with integrated slide rule for making navigational calculations during flight.
 1970: Asian manufacturers initiate direct competition with the Swiss watchmaking industry by releasing inexpensive electronic quartz regulated timepieces onto the world markets. By continuing to build mechanical timepieces for military, industrial, and professional clients not influenced by changing fads and convention, Gallet survives the so-called "quartz crisis".
 1975: Upon the death of Léon Gallet, sons Pierre and Bernard assume management of the company. They acquire the Racine Company, which has been struggling as a result of devaluation of the U.S. dollar.
 1983: Excelsior Park closes its factory on 6 April due to the lack of family successors and a sizable decrease in orders of mechanical movements from its Gallet partner during the difficult "quartz crisis". To continue to support owners of Excelsior Park powered watches, Gallet acquires the balance of the company's remaining inventory and assets. An attempt in 1984 by the Flume Company of Germany to revitalize Excelsior Park name proves unsuccessful.
 1984: Wein Brothers, a Canadian distributor of timing instruments, contracts with the Gallet Company to manufacture rugged wristwatches for distribution to the US Government. To facilitate the initial transactions, the watch dials (faces) of these military specification watches are marked Marathon, a previously held Gallet trademark. Wein Brothers continues to distribute military timepieces and related products under the Marathon brand to the present day.
 1990: Gallet supplies 30,000 “Marathon Navigator” wristwatches to the U.S. military for Operation Desert Storm. Prior to the fulfillment of the contract, prototypes are arduously tested by the US Government to withstand the most adverse of circumstances. All examples exceed the military's strict requirements for sustaining accuracy and functionality during combat conditions.
 1991: Pierre Gallet retires from the company due to ill health. His brother Bernard assumes control of the company, which continues to focus on the manufacture of professional-use timepieces.
 1996: To facilitate expansion, Bernard Gallet enters into a partnership with B. Neresheimer Ltd., a company with over a hundred years experience in the manufacture and distribution of fine silver wares and high-end luxury goods.
 2002: The Gallet factory is relocated from La Chaux-de-Fonds to Grandson, a canton of Vaud approximately one hour from Geneva. Walter Hediger, a member of the Neresheimer family, takes the reins of Gallet as its CEO.
 2004: Company activity becomes concentrated near Zurich. Bernard Gallet remains active with the company until his death in 2006.
 2005: David R. Laurence (a.k.a. "The Chrono Guy"), watch industry veteran with over forty years of experience in the areas of design, manufacturing, and marketing of fine jewelry and luxury level timepieces, joins Gallet as chief watchmaker and designer.
 2008: Gallet & Co co-sponsors "Time in Office" at the National Watch and Clock Museum, an exhibition of timepieces worn by America's presidents extending back to the pocket watches of George Washington. One of the featured items in the exhibit is the Gallet Flight Officer chronograph worn by Harry S Truman during his years in office as the 33rd president of the US.
 2009: Gallet & Co co-sponsors "Time & Exploration" at the National Watch and Clock Museum, an exhibit highlighting the importance of time and timekeeping in the fields of exploration and navigation.
 2010: Under the direction of Walter Hediger and David R. Laurence, Gallet & Co co-sponsors "Grand Complications", a temporary exhibit at the National Watch and Clock Museum featuring some of the most complexly engineered timepieces in watchmaking history.
 2012: Under the direction of David R. Laurence, Gallet & Co co-sponsors "Enlisting Time", a temporary exhibit at the National Watch and Clock Museum featuring numerous personal timepieces and accompanying stories of those who have served their countries for the last 250 years. Watches in the exhibit included George Washington's pocket watch, the Gallet chronograph worn by Fred Gerretson while serving as war photographer during the Invasion of Normandy, and the Gallet wristwatch worn by 2nd LT James Richard Hoel when his plane was shot down in the  Netherlands by the Germans during WWII. Hoel was sent to the prison camp Stalag Luft III, about 100 miles southeast of Berlin, which was portrayed in the 1963 movie "The Great Escape". He was among the imprisoned officers who helped dig the tunnels as depicted in the movie.
 2013: With the support and assistance of David R. Laurence and the Gallet & Co, renowned timekeeping historian and curator, Adam Harris, installs a permanent exhibit at the National Watch and Clock Museum entitled "At Arm's Length: The History of the Wristwatch". The exhibit provides a comprehensive view of the evolution of the wristwatch, from the small pocket watches that were first strapped to the wrist in leather holders, through the numerous technological advancements in wristwatch functionality during the 20th century, and concluding with the wrist-worn timekeeping marvels of the present day.
 2018: Designed by David R. Laurence and Laurent Auberson, Gallet introduces the 100th Anniversary Racing Heritage chronograph in commemoration of the initial 1918 order of the company's wrist-worn timers by the Indianapolis Speedway for use when the track reopened after WWI in 1919. This original 1918 Gallet version is the first known use of wrist chronographs for auto racing instead of previously used hand-held stopwatches.

Early innovations
Among the Gallet's professional timekeeping innovations are:

 The first wristwatch with a center-originating sweep second hand for heart rate calculation (1912)
 The first timepiece designed specifically for yacht racing (Gallet Yachting Timer, 1915)
 The first wristwatch with a faster 28,800 BPH escapement (Racine Quick-Train, 1928)
 The first wrist chronograph with a waterproof case (Gallet MultiChron Clamshell, 1936)
 The first chronograph wristwatch with multiple time zone calculator (Gallet Flight Officer, 1939)
 The first wristwatch with rotating bezel (Philippe Weiss, inventor) (Gallet Flight Officer, 1939)
 The first miniature chronograph wristwatch for professional women (Gallet MultiChron Petite, 1939)
 The first 45-minute recording wrist chronograph (Gallet MultiChron 45, 1942)
 The first stopwatch with a built-in spare parts compartment for quick repairs (1943)
 The first chronograph wristwatch with additional 24-hour GMT hand (Gallet MultiChron Navigator, 1945)
 The first "waterproof" stopwatch (Gallet Yachting Timer, 1945)
 The first 24-hour reading wrist chronograph (Gallet MultiChron 24HR, 1947)

Early awards and recognition
 1896 Swiss National Exposition, Geneva — Silver Medal
 1905 Universal Exposition of Liege — Grand Diploma of Honor
 1912  Kew Observatory, London: "A" Class Certificates, Special and Series Prizes for the Best Chronometers at Neuchâtel
 1913  Kew Observatory, London: "A" Class Certificates, Special and Series Prizes for the Best Chronometers at Neuchâtel
 1914 Swiss National Exposition, Berne — Grand Prize in the Chronometer category
 1917  Canton Observatory, Neuchâtel — 1st Place Award for Chronometer Accuracy
 1919  Canton Observatory, Neuchâtel — 1st Place Award for Chronometer Accuracy
 1919  Kew Observatory, London: "A" Class “Especially Good” Certificate for a Chronometer
 1923  Canton Observatory, Neuchâtel — 1st and 3rd Place Awards for Chronometer Accuracy

Gallet brands/trademarks (pre-1940s)

 Breadfort Watch Co. (reg. pre-1898, pocket watches)
 Bridgeport Watch Co. (reg. 17 Dec 1886, pocket watches)
 Chancellor Watch (reg. pre-1898, pocket watches)
 Chief (reg. 28 Aug 1889, pocket watches)
 Commodore (reg. 7 May 1889, pocket watches)
 Continental Watch Co. (reg. 12 Aug 1879, high-grade and complicated pocket watches for US market)
 Courvoisier (founded in the 1700s) historic manufacturer of complicated clocks and watches, controlled by the Courvoisier and Gallet families during the late 19th and early 20th century
 Defender (reg. pre-1895, pocket watches)
 Director Watch Co. (reg. pre-1895, pocket watches)
 Duchess (reg. pre-1898, woman's pocket watches)
 Electa & Cie. (extra high-grade & complicated pocket watches))
 Enterprise (reg. pre-1898, pocket watches)
 Eureka Time Keeper / Eureka Watch Co. (reg. 14 Jan 1884, pocket watches w/ Agassiz and Longines movements for American market)
 Favorite (reg. 16 Feb 1884, pocket watches)
 Galco (reg. 14 Mar 1925, Excelsior Park stopwatches)
 Gipsy (reg. pre-1895, woman's pocket watches)
 Governor (reg. pre-1898, rail road style pocket watches)
 Harlem Watch Co. (reg. pre-1898, pocket watches)
 Interocean (reg. 3 Jun 1910, Canadian Rail Road pocket watches)
 Jerome Park Watch Co. (reg. pre-1924, high grade pocket chronographs with Excelsior Park and Minerva movements)
 Jarco Watch (reg. pre-1898, pocket watches)
 Lady Racine (reg. 12 Aug 1879, lady's pocket watches)
 Lifetime Series (reg. 19 Oct 1914, high grade watches, produced in the Electa workshop for Macy's, New York)
 Lily (reg. 17 Jan 1881, lady's pocket watches)
 Majesty (reg. pre-1897, lady's pocket watches)
 Marathon (reg. 19 Oct 1915, pocket watches, wrist chronographs with Excelsior Park movements, wristwatches for United States and Canadian military)
 Mars (reg. pre-1900, pocket watches and wristlets for British market, later changed to Mars MultiChron)
 National Park (reg. 13 Jan 1891, high-grade stopwatches & horse timers w/ Excelsior Park Alfred Lugrin patent #359 movements)
 Park Watch Company (reg. 21 Sep 1929, Excelsior Park powered stopwatches)
 Patriot Watch (reg. 16 Apr 1889, pocket watches)
 Profundus (first diver's wristwatch with integral depth gauge, 1966)
 QuickTrain (earliest commercially produced wrist watch with faster beat movement)
 Racine (watches sold in North America)
 Racine Royale (watches sold in North America)
 Railroad Watch (reg. 12 Aug 1879)
 Richmond (reg. 29 Aug 1889, pocket watches)
 Security (Excelsior Park powered stopwatches)
 Select (reg. pre-1898, Excelsior Park stopwatches)
 Speedway Watch Co. (reg. 1918, stopwatches and other timing devices for auto racing )
 Success (reg. 13 Jan 1891, pocket watches)
 The Sun (reg. 1901, Excelsior Park powered stopwatches, manufactured by Gallet for Louis Goering of La Chaux-de-Fonds, used by the Wright brothers in 1903)
 The Wonder (reg. 11 Jul 1892, pocket watches)
 Trilby Watch (reg. pre-1895, pocket watches)
 Trotter (reg. pre-1897, Excelsior Park powered stopwatches & horse timers)
 Union Square (reg. 2 Oct 1883, pocket watches)
 Warrior Watch (reg. pre-1898, pocket watches)

Gallet watch and clock making dynasty

 Humbertus Gallet (1430–1492) clock maker, became a citizen of Geneva on 18 April 1466
 Gonin Gallet (1543–1610 ) grandson of Humbertus Gallet, clock maker, Geneva
 Claude Gallet (1605–1675) son of Gonin Gallet, watch and clock maker, Geneva
 Jacques Gallet (1649–1700) son of Claude Gallet, watchmaker and silk merchant, Geneva
 Philippe Gallet (1679–1739) son of Jacques Gallet, goldsmith & watchmaker, Geneva, began his apprenticeship with Simon Duteil on 8 April 1692
 Pierre Gallet (1712–1768) son of Philippe Gallet, goldsmith & watchmaker, Geneva
 Jeremie Gallet (1729–1763) son of Pierre Gallet, watchmaker, apprenticed under Benedict de Rabours in 1745, Geneva
 Jacques Gallet (1745–1806) son of Pierre Gallet, goldsmith, watch & case maker, Geneva
 Jean-Louis Gallet (1774–1809) son of Jacques Gallet, goldsmith, watchmaker, watch case maker, Geneva
 Julien Gallet (1806–1849) son of Jean-Louis Gallet, watch & case maker, registered family business in La Chaux-de=Fonds as Gallet & Cie.
 Louise Gallet (1808–1865) widow of Julien Gallet, ran the company after her husband's death
 Léon L. Gallet (1832–1899) son of Julien Gallet, husband of Adele Nicolet of the La Chaux-de-Fonds Goering-Nicolet family of watchmakers
 Lucien F. Gallet (1834–1879) son of Julien Gallet, watchmaker, La Chaux-de-Fonds & Geneva
 Julien Gallet (1862–1934) son of Leon L. Gallet, watchmaker, La Chaux-de-Fonds
 Georges L. Gallet (1865–1946) son of Leon L. Gallet, watchmaker, La Chaux-de-Fonds (together with wife Berthe Courvoisier Gallet and brother-in-law Émile Courvoisier, controlled the Courvoisier Frères watch company)
 Léon Gallet (1899–1975) son of Georges and Berthe (née Courvoisier) Gallet, watchmaker, La Chaux-de-Fonds
 Pierre Gallet (1926–1995) son of Leon Gallet, watchmaker, La Chaux-de-Fonds
 Bernard L. Gallet (1930–2006) son of Leon Gallet, watchmaker, La Chaux-de-Fonds

Wrist watch models—1900 to the present

 Excel-O-Graph: pilot's navigational chronograph with rotating slide rule bezel, introduced in 1960
 Flight Officer (a.k.a. Flying Officer in United Kingdom): pilot's wrist chronograph with world time zone calculator, introduced in 1939
 Marathon Navigator: water resistant antimagnetic pilot's watch with rotating 12-hour bezel, introduced in 1984
 MultiChron 12: professional wrist chronograph with 12-hour recording capabilities, introduced in 1935
 MultiChron 30M: professional wrist chronograph with 30-minute recording capabilities, introduced in 1914
 MultiChron 45M: professional wrist chronograph with 45-minute recording capabilities, introduced in 1942
 MultiChron Astronomic: 12-hour wrist chronograph with triple date and moon phase, introduced in 1947
 MultiChron Calendar: professional wrist chronograph with accurate day, date, and month functions, introduced in 1945
 MultiChron "Clamshell": early water resistant version of the MultiChron 30, produced between 1936 and 1951
 MultiChron Commander: mid-size wrist chronograph for both men and women professionals, introduced in 1938
 MultiChron Decimal: professional wrist chronograph for technical & scientific use, introduced in 1942
 MultiChron MediGraph: (a.k.a. Pulsimeter) professional wrist chronograph with heart rate calculator, introduced in 1943
 MultiChron Navigator GMT: professional wrist chronograph with additional 24 GMT hour hand, introduced in 1943
 MultiChron Officer: small size square dress or formal wrist chronograph for officers, introduced in 1939
 MultiChron Petite: miniature wrist chronograph for professional and enlisted women, introduced in 1936
 MultiChron Pilot: pilot's wrist chronograph with rotating time zone bezel, introduced in 1940
 MultiChron Pilot Petite: miniature wrist chronograph with time zone bezel for women pilots
 MultiChron Profundus: professional scuba diver's chronograph with rotating 60-minute bezel
 MultiChron Rattrapante: wrist chronograph with simultaneous dual or split function recording
 MultiChron Regulator: professional wrist chronograph with offset minute and hour dial, introduced in 1928
 MultiChron Yachting: professional wrist chronograph with regatta countdown timer, introduced in 1945
 MultiChron Racing Heritage: updated version of the model 12 motorsports chronograph with dual mainsprings, introduced in 2018

Vintage wrist watch gallery

Historic timer gallery

References

Bibliography
 .
 .
 .
 .
 .

External links
 Official Gallet Website
 National Watch and Clock Museum
 Musée International d'Horlogerie
 GalletWorld.com—The Gallet Information Resource
 Gallet in the news

Luxury brands
Watch manufacturing companies of Switzerland
Watch movement manufacturers
Companies based in the canton of Zürich
Swiss watch brands